Uroš Nikolić may refer to:

 Uroš Nikolić (footballer) (born 1993), Serbian football midfielder
 Uroš Nikolić (basketball) (born 1987), Serbian basketball player
 Uroš Nikolić (swimmer) (born 1996), Serbian swimmer
 Uros Nikolic (judoka), represented Australia at the 2022 Commonwealth Games